The Princeton Glacier is a glacier in the Sargent Icefield, Kenai Peninsula in Alaska.

The glacier was named in 1909 for Princeton University by George Perkins of the U.S. Coast and Geodetic Survey.

The glacier's terminus is a little over a mile from Nassau Fjord and Prince William Sound.

See also
List of glaciers

References

Glaciers of Alaska
Glaciers of Chugach Census Area, Alaska
Glaciers of Unorganized Borough, Alaska